The Trofeo Città di Brescia is a tennis tournament held in Brescia, Italy since 2014. The event is part of the ATP Challenger Tour and is played on indoor carpet courts.

Past finals

Singles

Doubles

External links
 Official website

 
Tennis tournaments in Italy
Carpet court tennis tournaments
Sport in Brescia